Baywood Greens is a public golf club located in Long Neck, Delaware that is consistently rated as one of the very best in the state.

The front nine holes are nicknamed the "Woods Nine", while the back nine holes carry the "Water Nine" nickname.  A third 9-hole grouping is planned on the north side of Delaware Route 24, which is supposed to be the "Sand Nine".

The course is noted for having over 200,000 flowers, plants, shrubs, and trees that decorate the playing area.

With the future construction of a large hotel, the owners hope to vie for PGA tournament status.

A medium-sized community of upscale modular homes surrounds the golf course.

Notes

External links 
Official Site
Article on Baywood Greens Golf Course
Reviews and Ratings of Baywood Greens Golf Course

Golf clubs and courses in Delaware
Buildings and structures in Sussex County, Delaware
Tourist attractions in Sussex County, Delaware